Summer Rappaport (née Cook) is an American professional triathlete. At the 2020 Summer Olympics she competed in the women's triathlon race, placing 14th. During the 2019 ITU World Triathlon Series Rappaport took fifth in the final rankings.

Early life
Rappaport graduated from Mountain Range High School in Westminster, Colorado in 2009 and from Villanova University in 2013, where she was a runner and a swimmer. At Villanova, Rappaport earned a degree in political science.

Career 
In 2014, Rappaport finished 5th at the Mixed Relay Pan American Championships. In the following season, she finished 2nd at the ITU Triathlon World Cup event in Alanya.

For the 2016 racing season, Rappaport won the 2016 ITU World Triathlon Series event in Edmonton. This was alongside World Cup victories in Chengdu, Tongyeong, and second place finishes in Salinas and Alanya, with the latter bettering her placing from the previous year. She finished the year ranked 19th in the World Triathlon Series. The next racing year, in 2017, Rappaport took gold at Miyazaki, Tongyeong (for the second year running) and Yucatan in the ITU Triathlon World Cup. She finished 2017 ranked 10th in the ITU World Triathlon Series.

In 2018, Rappaport took gold at Miyazaki and Antwerp in the ITU Triathlon World Cup. Later on, in the run-up to the Leeds ITU World Triathlon Series race, Rarraport's bike was broken in transit and was ultimately registered a DNF in the race, having struggled with her mindset. She would finish the year ranked 25th in the World Triathlon Series, a drop of 15 places over the previous year. The following year Rapport rebounded by finishing on the podium in three races in the World Triathlon Series level, with second places at Edmonton and Yokohama, and third at the Hamburg race. She also took gold in the Huatlco World Cup event. She finished 2019 ranking 5th in the Series, which was her best season placing to date.

Personal life
In 2018, she married Ian Rappaport

References

Living people
American female triathletes
1991 births
Triathletes at the 2020 Summer Olympics
Olympic triathletes of the United States
21st-century American women